The 1923–24 FA Cup was the 49th season of the world's oldest football cup competition, the Football Association Challenge Cup, commonly known as the FA Cup. Newcastle United won the competition for the second time, beating Aston Villa 2–0 in the final at Wembley.

Matches were scheduled to be played at the stadium of the team named first on the date specified for each round, which was always a Saturday. Some matches, however, might be rescheduled for other days if there were clashes with games for other competitions or the weather was inclement. If scores were level after 90 minutes had been played, a replay would take place at the stadium of the second-named team later the same week. If the replayed match was drawn further replays would be held until a winner was determined. If scores were level after 90 minutes had been played in a replay, a 30-minute period of extra time would be played.

Calendar
The format of the FA Cup for the season had two preliminary rounds, six qualifying rounds, four proper rounds, and the semi finals and final.

First round proper
40 of the 44 clubs from the Football League First Division and Football League Second Division joined the 12 lower-league clubs who came through the qualifying rounds. Four Second Division sides, Port Vale, Stockport County, Nelson and Coventry City, were entered at the fifth qualifying round, with the Third Division North and South teams. Amateur side Corinthian were given a free entry to the first round. To make the number of teams up to 64, nine Third Division South sides and only two Third Division North sides were given byes to this round. These were:

Watford
Brighton & Hove Albion
Luton Town
Swindon Town
Queens Park Rangers
Charlton Athletic
Millwall
Swansea Town
Plymouth Argyle
Wolverhampton Wanderers
Bradford Park Avenue

32 matches were scheduled to be played on Saturday, 12 January 1924. Seven matches were drawn and went to replays in the following midweek fixture, of which two went to another replay.

Second round proper
The 16 Second Round matches were played on Saturday, 2 February 1924. Eight matches were drawn, with replays taking place in the following midweek fixture. Three of these then went to a second replay played the following week, and two of these went to a third replay.

Third round proper
The eight Third Round matches were scheduled for Saturday, 23 February 1924. Two matches were drawn and went to replays in the following midweek fixture.

Fourth round proper
The four Fourth Round matches were scheduled for Saturday, 8 March 1924. There were two replays, played in the following midweek fixture.

Semi-finals

The semi-final matches were played on Saturday, 29 March 1924. The matches ended in victories for Newcastle United and Aston Villa, who went on to meet in the final at Wembley.

Final

The 1924 FA Cup Final was contested by Newcastle United and Aston Villa at Wembley. Newcastle won 2–0, the goals scored by Neil Harris and Stan Seymour.

Match details

See also
FA Cup Final Results 1872-

References
General
Official site; fixtures and results service at TheFA.com
1923-24 FA Cup at rsssf.com
1923-24 FA Cup at soccerbase.com

Specific

FA Cup seasons
FA
FA